Amyema biniflora, the twin-flower mistletoe,  is a species of flowering plant within the genus Amyema, an epiphytic hemiparasitic plant of the family Loranthaceae endemic to Queensland, Australia.

Type species
Type: Endeavour R., Banks & Solander, 1770 (BM, holotype; MEL; NSW).

Description
A. biniflora is a pendulous mistletoe, with flat leaves up 15 cm long and 1 cm wide. Its inflorescence is an umbel of two or dyads (flowering in groups of two).  The corolla is smooth and slender and green at maturity. The fruit is ovoid and the flower bract does not enlarge as the fruit matures. The buds and fruit are smooth.

Ecology
A. biniflora is found on bloodwoods and spotted gums (eucalypts).

Taxonomy
A. biniflora was first described by Barlow in 1966.

See also 
North Queensland Plants: Amyema biniflora images

References

biniflora
Flora of Queensland
Parasitic plants
Epiphytes
Taxa named by Bryan Alwyn Barlow